Smilkov is a municipality and village in Benešov District in the Central Bohemian Region of the Czech Republic. It has about 300 inhabitants.

Administrative parts
Villages of Kouty, Líštěnec, Oldřichovec, Plachova Lhota and Zechov are administrative parts of Smilkov.

Gallery

References

Villages in Benešov District